The Cinnaminson Township Public Schools is a comprehensive community public school district that serves students in pre-kindergarten through twelfth grade from Cinnaminson Township, in Burlington County, New Jersey, United States.

As of the 2020–21 school year, the district, comprised of four schools, had an enrollment of 2,698 students and 217.4 classroom teachers (on an FTE basis), for a student–teacher ratio of 12.4:1.

The district is classified by the New Jersey Department of Education as being in District Factor Group "FG", the fourth-highest of eight groupings. District Factor Groups organize districts statewide to allow comparison by common socioeconomic characteristics of the local districts. From lowest socioeconomic status to highest, the categories are A, B, CD, DE, FG, GH, I and J.

The Project Challenge program is a program for gifted students from grades 2 through 8 who attend New Albany Elementary School, Eleanor Rush Intermediate School and Cinnaminson Middle School, where students can learn more while having fun. Project Challenge was conceived by Elaine Mendelow, a teacher in the district, who taught it for over 20 years, now being retired from the program.

Schools 
Schools in the district (with 2020–21) enrollment data from the National Center for Education Statistics) are:
Elementary schools
New Albany Elementary School with 606 students in grades PreK - 2
Valerie Jones, Principal
Eleanor Rush Intermediate School with 605 students in grades 3 - 5
Kerry DiSimone, Principal
Middle school
Cinnaminson Middle School with 646 students in grades 6 - 8
Kristin Melcher, Principal
High school
Cinnaminson High School with 829 students in grades 9 through 12
Ryan Gorman, Principal

 Defunct schools
 In 1948, during de jure educational segregation in the United States, the district had a school for black children. In 1948 there were two shifts of first grade classes as the black school had a relatively large student count. The white and black schools were in proximity with one another.

Administration
Core members of the district's administration are:
Stephen M. Cappello, Superintendent
Melissa Livengood, Business Administrator / Board Secretary

Board of education
The district's board of education, comprised of nine members, sets policy and oversees the fiscal and educational operation of the district through its administration. As a Type II school district, the board's trustees are elected directly by voters to serve three-year terms of office on a staggered basis, with three seats up for election each year held (since 2012) as part of the November general election. The board appoints a superintendent to oversee the district's day-to-day operations and a business administrator to supervise the business functions of the district.

Board of Education members are:

 Laura Fitzwater, President 
 Christine Turner, Vice-President
 Michael Bramhall
 Daniel Gaffney
 DonnaMarie Iacone
 Edward Kenney
 James McGuckin
 Kathleen Quinn
 Christine Trampé

References

External links
Cinnaminson Township Public Schools

School Data for the Cinnaminson Township Public Schools, National Center for Education Statistics

Cinnaminson Township, New Jersey
New Jersey District Factor Group FG
School districts in Burlington County, New Jersey